Georg Weidner (born 14 January 1914, date of death unknown) was an Austrian wrestler. He competed in the men's Greco-Roman featherweight at the 1948 Summer Olympics.

References

External links
 

1914 births
Year of death missing
Austrian male sport wrestlers
Olympic wrestlers of Austria
Wrestlers at the 1948 Summer Olympics
People from Darmstadt-Dieburg
Sportspeople from Darmstadt (region)